Winged Samurai: Saburo Sakai and the Zero Fighter Pilots is a 1985 book by Henry Sakaida dealing with the wartime history of Saburō Sakai and other Imperial Japanese Navy Air Service pilots who flew the Mitsubishi A6M Zero. It was published by Champlin Fighter Museum Press.

See also
Samurai! - Autobiographical book by Saburo Sakai co-written with Fred Saito and Martin Caidin

References

1985 non-fiction books
Aviation books